P.C. (Patrick) van den Brink (born 6 November 1967 in Hilversum) is a Dutch politician and former civil servant. He is a member of the Christian Democratic Appeal (Christen-Democratisch Appèl).

From 15 May 2007 until 2014 he was mayor of IJsselstein, which is a municipality of the province of Utrecht. From 2001 till April 2006 he was an alderman of Hilversum, which is a municipality of the province of North Holland.

See also 
 List of Dutch politicians

References 
  Rijksoverheid.nl

External links 
  Mayor Patrick van den Brink, Municipality of IJsselstein website

1967 births
Living people
20th-century Dutch civil servants
21st-century Dutch politicians
Aldermen in North Holland
Christian Democratic Appeal politicians
Mayors in Utrecht (province)
People from Hilversum
People from IJsselstein